Diguan Pigot (born June 24, 1994) is a Surinamese swimmer. At the 2012 Summer Olympics, he competed in the Men's 100 metre breaststroke, finishing in 43rd place in the heats, failing to reach the semifinals. He was born in Paramaribo.

References

Surinamese male swimmers
1994 births
Living people
Sportspeople from Paramaribo
Competitors at the 2010 South American Games
Pan American Games competitors for Suriname
Swimmers at the 2011 Pan American Games
Olympic swimmers of Suriname
Swimmers at the 2012 Summer Olympics
Male breaststroke swimmers